Mason County Courthouse may refer to:

Mason County Courthouse (Michigan), Ludington, Michigan
Mason County Courthouse (Texas), Mason, Texas
Mason County Courthouse (Washington), Shelton, Washington, listed on the National Register of Historic Places